Daffy Duck Slept Here is a 1948 Warner Bros. Merrie Melodies cartoon, directed by Robert McKimson. The cartoon was released on March 6, 1948, and stars Porky Pig and Daffy Duck.

Plot
Porky is looking all over the big city for a hotel room, but due to a convention there are no vacancies. Porky takes the only available vacancy at one hotel, but will have to share with Daffy Duck, who is a very loud, obnoxious and annoying sort. Daffy introduces his invisible kangaroo friend "Hymie" (a reference to Harvey), but Porky denies the kangaroo's existence despite evidence from Daffy getting inside Hymie's 'pouch', becoming partially invisible, and Hymie jumping around with Daffy riding in it.

Daffy spends the rest of the night annoying Porky: pestering him with questions, shaking the bed, spilling water from a glass, hogging the blanket and finally literally sending the both of them flying off the bed when Daffy kicks, and startles, Porky with his literally frozen feet. Fed up with his antics, Porky stuffs Daffy in a pillow case and drops him out of the window. As Porky goes back to sleep, Daffy returns bandaged, but shakes the bandages off and prepares to get revenge.

Daffy tricks the half-asleep pig into stepping out of a window thinking he's boarding a train. Daffy pulls down the blind saying it's "too gruesome" to watch. Suddenly he hears train noises, and behind the shade, sees the still-drowsy Porky pulling away on an actual train and waving goodbye at Daffy. Daffy finds this silly, saying that he should've bought Porky some magazines to read on his trip. Then he bounces all around the room, "Hoo-Hoo!"-ing wildly.

Production notes
The title is a play on the cliché, "George Washington slept here." The film is a sequel to 1947's A Pest in the House, which also features Daffy disturbing a hotel patron's sleep.

See also
 Looney Tunes and Merrie Melodies filmography (1940–1949)

References

External links

 

Merrie Melodies short films
Warner Bros. Cartoons animated short films
1948 animated films
1948 short films
1948 films
Films directed by Robert McKimson
Films set in hotels
Daffy Duck films
Porky Pig films
Films scored by Carl Stalling
1940s Warner Bros. animated short films